Walter Charles Crosby Jr. (May 5, 1921 – September 13, 2006) was an American Negro league catcher in the 1940s.

A native of Laurel, Mississippi, Crosby served in the US Army during World War II and played for the Cleveland Buckeyes in 1944. He died in Erie, Pennsylvania, in 2006 at age 85.

References

External links
 and Seamheads

1921 births
2006 deaths
Cleveland Buckeyes players
20th-century African-American sportspeople
21st-century African-American people